The following elections occurred in the year 1857.

 1857 French legislative election
 1857 Liberian general election

North America

United States
 1857 New York state election
 United States Senate election in New York, 1857

Europe

United Kingdom
 List of MPs elected in the 1857 United Kingdom general election
 1857 United Kingdom general election

See also
 :Category:1857 elections

1857
Elections